Rajavinit Mathayom School (RNM)   (is a state school located in Bangkok, Thailand.

History 

The land used to be the location of the Royal Stables of King Vajiravudh. The school serves students who finish their primary education at Rajavinit School and the children of those who work in the Royal Household Bureau.

The school's name means "a place for training children of secondary level to be good citizens of His Majesty".

On April 4, 1978 the Ministry of Education announced the establishment of the school.

Awards 
Marching band of Rajavinit Mathayom School 1998
King's Cup for Marching Band 1998
HRH Crown Prince Cup at Siam Crown Pediatrics 1996 and 2000
Winner of Singapore MUSE Festival in Singapore twice
Winner of 21st Century Art Festival in china twice
Winner of Beijing International Music Competition in China 
Gold Medal of World Wind Symphony Competition in New York, USA

School tree 
Tabebuia rosea

Sport
The Five Sporting Houses are:
 Morakot, also known as Emerald (Green) 
 Petai, also known as Zircon (Pink) 
 Pailin,  also known as Sapphire (Blue) 
 Gomen,  also known as Garnet (Red) 
 Bussarakam,  also known as Topaz (Yellow)

Directors of the school 
Lady Poungrat Vivakarn
Lady Somjint Napackseewong
Miss Suwanna Aimpradit
Miss Sukunya Suntipatanachai
Miss Jimsripetch Sakun
Mr. Pirat Korabongkotchmat
Dr. Buntum Pimpaporn

Notable alumni
 Petai Ploymeka - Thai singer and actor.
 Putthipat Kulprechaseth - Thai singer.

References

Schools in Bangkok
Dusit district